Beatrix Csatáné Balogh (born 12 December 1974) is a retired Hungarian handball player, European champion and Olympic silver medalist. She retired from professional handball in 2011. Between 2011 and 2016, Balogh was the player-coach of Marcali VSZSE. Since 2016, she is the player-coach of Egerszegi KK.

Balogh debuted in the Hungarian national team on 5 March 1994 against Iceland, and participated in her first European Championship the same year, finishing fourth. She took part on another five continental events (1996, 1998, 2002, 2004, 2006), winning the 2000 edition.

Balogh participated in five World Championships as well (1997, 1999, 2001, 2005, 2007), achieving a bronze medal in 2005. In addition, she received a silver medal at the 2000 Summer Olympics in Sydney.

Achievements

Club
Nemzeti Bajnokság I:
Winner: 1998, 1999, 2001
Magyar Kupa:
Winner: 1998, 1999
Women Handball Austria:
Winner: 2002, 2003, 2004
ÖHB Cup:
Winner: 2002, 2003, 2004
EHF Champions League:
Winner: 1999
EHF Cup:
Winner: 1998, 2005
EHF Champions Trophy:
Winner: 1999

National team
Olympic Games:
Silver Medalist: 2000
World Championship:
Bronze Medalist: 2005
European Championship:
Winner: 2000
Bronze Medalist: 1998, 2004

Awards and recognition
 Hungarian Handballer of the Year: 1997
 All-Star Right Wing of the World Championship: 2001
 Nemzeti Bajnokság I Top Scorer: 2006
 Knight's Cross of the Order of Merit of the Republic of Hungary:2000

References

External links
 
 
 

1974 births
Living people
People from Kaposvár
Hungarian female handball players
Hungarian handball coaches
Olympic silver medalists for Hungary
Handball players at the 2000 Summer Olympics
Expatriate handball players
Hungarian expatriate sportspeople in Austria
Hungarian expatriate sportspeople in Spain
Olympic medalists in handball
Knight's Crosses of the Order of Merit of the Republic of Hungary (civil)
Fehérvár KC players
Medalists at the 2000 Summer Olympics
Sportspeople from Somogy County